Calosoma macrum is a species of ground beetle in the subfamily Carabinae. It was described by John Lawrence LeConte in 1852. It flies in June and October.

References

protractum
Beetles described in 1852
Endemic insects of Mexico